Lecture room may refer to:

 Classroom
 Lecture Room, program of China Central Television